Merston is a village and parish in the Chichester district of West Sussex, England. It is in the civil parish of Oving.

History
Merston was listed in the Domesday Book (1086) in the ancient hundred of Boxgrove as having 16 households, meadows, plough land, and three mills.

RAF Merston 
Nearby was RAF Merston, a World War II airfield. The airfield was in use from 1939 to 1945.

References

External links

Villages in West Sussex